Manito Golf and Country Club is a country club in the northwest United States, located in Spokane, Washington. The club was founded in 1917 at Hart Field by a small group of dedicated golf enthusiasts and moved to its current location in the Comstock neighborhood in 1922. It was known as Manito Golf Club until 1935.

References

External links

Sports venues in Spokane, Washington
Golf clubs and courses in Washington (state)
1917 establishments in Washington (state)
Golf clubs and courses designed by A. V. Macan